Kantang Hot Spring Forest Park (Thai: วนอุทยานบ่อน้ำร้อนกันตัง) is a forest park in Thailand which is opened as a health care for tourist attraction.

Description 
Kantang Hot Spring Forest Park, also known as Khuan Kaeng Hot Spring, is located in Kantang District of Trang Province, the South of Thailand, on the area of Khuan Kaeng National Forest. The Royal Forest Department established it to be the Forest Park on June 9, 2006.
It is well known for local people and tourists; therefore, it became a destination for visitors to Trang Province and for people who care about their health.

Geology 
There is around 80,000 square meters in a plain area on foothills which include Kao Wang National Forest, Khuan Kaeng Forest and Nam Rab Forest. They are mostly tropical rain forests. Some area is the peat swamp forest that makes flooding happens all the year. In some parts, there is hot water always springing in the surface, which is called Hot Spring.
The ground contains several kinds of rocks and stones which are red scree, brown sandstone and shale.

Flora 
There have been plenty of nature in the forest, which are rubber, takian, wha, wild rose apple, tung fah, kor, daeng khuan, kradoan, tuanghon, waii, lumpi, palm and orchid.

Fauna 
Mammals: civet, dusky leaf monkey, mouse deer
Aves: wild chicken and various kind of birds
Amphibians: frogs
Reptiles: snakes
Marines: raninidaes

Tourist Attraction

Khuan Kaeng Hot Spring 
Hot Spring area has been developed to be 3 ponds with different constant temperature: 70, 40 and 20 Degree Celsius.  The visitor tend to come for their health, since it has minerals in hot water to improve the circulatory system.
There is also a public pond for dipping feet, another public pond for shower, and 9 private bathrooms.

Study Route 
There are 3 routes in the peat swamp forest and tropical rain forest area which are 500, 750 and 2,000 meters for studying plants and animals for Biological Diversity Research and support tourism in Thailand.

Service and Product 
There also be foot massage and Thai massage service, and selling spa products which contain mostly ingredients from the hot spring water.

References 

Forest parks of Thailand
Tourist attractions in Trang province